Erin Morley (born October 11, 1980) is an American operatic soprano.

Early years
Morley was born in Salt Lake City, Utah to David Palmer, a former singer in the Tabernacle Choir, and Elizabeth Palmer, a current concertmaster of the Salt Lake Symphony. Her first professional singing engagements were with the Utah Symphony with Joseph Silverstein and with the Tabernacle Choir on their worldwide broadcast Music & the Spoken Word under the baton of Craig Jessop. Morley obtained her undergraduate voice degree from Eastman School of Music, her Master of Music voice degree from the Juilliard School, and her Artist Diploma from the Juilliard Opera Center. Morley also trained at the Opera Theatre of Saint Louis, the Ravinia Festival Steans Institute, and the Wolf Trap Opera Company.

Career
Morley has performed in New York's Carnegie Hall and Metropolitan Opera (Met), and Opéra National de Paris. Morley's debut at the Met was as First Madrigal in Manon Lescaut in 2008.

Morley's breakthrough career moment came when she stepped in at the last minute to sing Sophie in Der Rosenkavalier at the Metropolitan Opera during the 2013–2014 season, which was hailed as "a major success". She has been described by The New York Times as a "limpid, fluid soprano", "silken clarity", and "needlepoint precision". In September 2018 she made her debut, while being 34 weeks pregnant, in Debussy's Le Martyre de saint Sébastien with the Deutsches Symphonie-Orchester Berlin.

When the COVID-19 pandemic struck, Morley was set to sing the part of Sophie in Werther for the Met's music director, Yannick Nézet-Séguin.

Personal life
Morley is married to John D. Morley, a Yale law professor, and they have three children. She is a member of the Church of Jesus Christ of Latter-day Saints.

Awards and honors
In 2007, she received the Florence & Paul DeRosa Prize from the Juilliard Opera Center. She won 1st prize in the Jessie Kneisel Lieder Competition in 2002, 1st place in the Licia Albanese-Puccini Foundation Competition in 2006, 3rd place in London's Wigmore Hall International Song Competition in 2009, and received the Richard Tucker Career Grant in 2013. The Met Opera production of Der Rosenkavalier, featuring Morley as Sophie, was nominated for the 2019 Grammy Award for Best Opera Recording. In 2022, she shared a Grammy Award for Best Choral Performance for her work as a soloist in Mahler's Symphony No. 8, as performed with the Los Angeles Philharmonic under the direction of Gustavo Dudamel.

Video
 Eurydice, opera in 3 acts with music by Matthew Aucoin and an English-language libretto by Sarah Ruhl (Erin Morley as Eurydice, Joshua Hopkins as Orpheus, Jakub Józef Orliński as Orpheus's double, Barry Banks as Hades, Nathan Berg as Eurydice's father, conducted by Yannick Nézet-Séguin), streaming HD video of a live performance at the Metropolitan Opera on 4 December 2021

References

External links 
 
 Metropolitan Opera: Erin Morley
 

1980 births
Living people
Eastman School of Music alumni
Juilliard School alumni
American operatic sopranos
21st-century American women opera singers
Singers from Utah
Classical musicians from Utah
Latter Day Saints from Utah